Grunerite is a mineral of the amphibole group of minerals with  formula Fe7Si8O22(OH)2. It is the iron endmember of the grunerite-cummingtonite series. It forms as fibrous, columnar or massive aggregates of crystals. The crystals are monoclinic prismatic. The luster is glassy to pearly with colors ranging from green, brown to dark grey. The Mohs hardness is 5 to 6 and the specific gravity is 3.4 to 3.5.

It was discovered in 1853 and named after Emmanuel-Louis Gruner (1809–1883), the Swiss-French chemist who first analysed it.

Amosite (fibrous grunerite) 

Amosite is a rare asbestiform variety of grunerite that was mined as asbestos predominantly in the eastern part of the Transvaal Province of South Africa. The origin of the name is Amosa, the acronym for the mining company "Asbestos Mines of South Africa".

References

External links

Inosilicates
Iron(II) minerals
Asbestos
Monoclinic minerals
Minerals in space group 12